Profiles is a live album by American jazz vibraphonist Gary McFarland featuring performances recorded at the Lincoln Centre Philharmonic Hall in 1966 for the Impulse! label.

Reception
The Allmusic review by Douglas Payne awarded the album 4½ stars calling it "An excellent collection of McFarland originals performed at Lincoln Center by a stellar orchestra of jazz luminaries".

Track listing
All compositions by Gary McFarland
 "Winter Colors" - 8:55
 "Willie" - 3:18
 "Sage Hands" - 6:41
 "Bygones and Boogie (Boogie & Out)" - 12:00
 "Mountain Heir" - 4:15
 "Milo's Other Samba" - 5:45
Recorded at the Lincoln Center Philharmonic Hall in New York City on February 6, 1966

Personnel
Gary McFarland – vibraphone, marimba, arranger, conductor
Bill Berry, John Frosk, Bernie Glow, Joe Newman, Clark Terry - trumpet, flugelhorn
Bob Brookmeyer, Jimmy Cleveland – trombone
Bob Northern - french horn
Jay McAllister - tuba
Phil Woods - alto saxophone, clarinet
Jerry Dodgion - alto saxophone, clarinet, flute
Zoot Sims - tenor saxophone, clarinet
Richie Kamuca - tenor saxophone, baritone saxophone, bass clarinet, english horn
Jerome Richardson - baritone saxophone, alto saxophone, clarinet, bass clarinet, flute, piccolo
Sam Brown, Gábor Szabó - guitar
Richard Davis - bass
Joe Cocuzzo – drums
Tommy Lopez - percussion

References

Impulse! Records live albums
Gary McFarland albums
1966 live albums
Albums produced by Bob Thiele
Albums recorded at the Lincoln Center for the Performing Arts
Albums conducted by Gary McFarland
Albums arranged by Gary McFarland